NS6, NS-6, NS.6, NS 6, or, variation, may refer to:

Places
 Sungei Kadut MRT station (station code: NS6), Sungei Kadut, Singapore
 Tada Station (Hyōgo), station code: NS06; Kawanishi, Hyōgo Prefecture, Japan
 Yoshinohara Station (station code: NS06), Kita-ku, Saitama, Japan
 Cape Breton-Richmond (constituency N.S. 06), Nova Scotia, Canada

Other uses
 Blue Origin NS-6, a 2016 October 5 Blue Origin suborbital spaceflight mission for the New Shepard
 RAF N.S. 6, a British NS class airship
 Rickenbacker NS-6, electric guitar; see List of Rickenbacker products
 Netscape 6, webbrowser
 New Penguin Shakespeare volume 6

See also

 NS (disambiguation)
 6 (disambiguation)